Čežarji is a settlement south of Dekani in the City Municipality of Koper in the Littoral region of Slovenia. The settlement includes the hamlets of Šimiči and Žnidarji.

Name
The name Čežarji is believed to be of Italian origin, derived from Cesari, the surname of a landowner that operated tenant farms in the area.

History
Čežarji was burned twice during the Second World War. The village burned on 15 May 1941, and a large number of houses were burned by German forces on 2 October 1943.

References

External links
Čežarji on Geopedia

Populated places in the City Municipality of Koper